George & Tammy & Tina is the sixth studio album by American country music artists George Jones and Tammy Wynette. The "Tina" in the title refers to Tina Byrd Jones, Tammy Wynette's then eight-year-old daughter from her marriage to Euple Byrd. George Jones adopted Tina and her sisters shortly after the birth of their daughter, Georgette. The album was released in 1975 on the Epic Records label. It peaked at number 37 on the Billboard country albums chart. The opening track, "We Loved It Away", reached number 8 on the Billboard country singles chart. Another single released that year, "God's Gonna Get'cha (For That)", peaked at number 25 on the Billboard country singles chart. In March 1974, a single was issued with two songs that ended up on the album, "No Charge", a collaboration between Tammy and her daughter, Tina, and the flip-side, "The Telephone Call", which is a collaboration between George and Tina and peaked as at number 25 on the Billboard country singles chart in 1974.

Track listing

Personnel
 The Nashville Edition
The Jordanaires - vocal accompaniment
Strings arranged by Bergen White

Production
Producer - Billy Sherrill
Engineer - Lou Bradley

External links
 George Jones' Official Website
 Tammy Wynette's Official Site
 Record Label

1975 albums
George Jones albums
Tammy Wynette albums
Albums produced by Billy Sherrill
Epic Records albums
Vocal duet albums